Ricardo Morris is the name of:

Ricardo Morris (footballer, born 1992), Jamaican footballer
Ricardio Morris, Barbadian footballer